The Statute Law (Repeals) Act 1974 is an Act of the Parliament of the United Kingdom.

It implemented recommendations contained in the fifth report on statute law revision, by the Law Commission and the Scottish Law Commission. It repealed 54 Acts in full and another 310 Acts in part. The Acts wholly or partially repealed by this Act were passed between 1581 and 1972.

This Act was partly in force in Great Britain at the end of 2010.

Section 2 - Preservation of enactments relating to protected policies of insurance
This section inserted section 17A of the Industrial and Friendly Societies Act 1948.

Section 3 - Application to Northern Ireland, Channel Islands and Isle of Man
In section 3(2), the words "or the Isle of Man" were repealed by Group 1 of Part IX of Schedule 1 to the Statute Law (Repeals) Act 1998.

Orders under this section

The power conferred by section 3(2) has been exercised by:
The Church Building Act 1831 (Repeal) (Jersey) Order 1983 (SI 1983/763)
The Statute Law Repeals (Isle of Man) Order 1984 (SI 1984/1692)

Schedule - Enactments repealed
The Schedule, except Parts III, VI and VII and the savings specified at the end of those Parts, was repealed by Group 1 of Part IX of Schedule 1 to the Statute Law (Repeals) Act 1998.

See also
Statute Law (Repeals) Act

References
Halsbury's Statutes. Fourth Edition. 2008 Reissue. Volume 41. Page 785.
The Public General Acts and General Synod Measures 1974. HMSO. London. 1975. Part I.
HL Deb vol 350, cols 522 and  1032 to 1035, vol 352, col 738.

United Kingdom Acts of Parliament 1974